Hayes Barnard is an American entrepreneur. He is currently the founder, chairman, and CEO of GoodLeap, a technology-based finance company. Barnard is also the founder, chairman, and CEO of GivePower, a nonprofit that facilitates solar powered projects to provide clean water and energy systems to underserved communities.

Early life and education
Barnard was born and raised by a single mother in Creve Coeur, Missouri, a suburb of St. Louis. His father left when Barnard was three years old. Barnard graduated from the University of Missouri with a degree in management and marketing. He won a football scholarship to Central Missouri State, but was injured during his freshman year and subsequently transferred to the University of Missouri, where he graduated with a degree in management and marketing.

Career 
In 1995 Barnard went to San Francisco to be a part of the hi-tech boom. His first jobs were manning booths at trade shows. He then went on to work at Oracle as a sales executive. In September 2003, Barnard founded Paramount Equity Mortgage (later renamed to Loanpal and subsequently rebranded to GoodLeap), one of the first to provide online residential home loans. In 2008, he founded Paramount Solar, a subsidiary of Paramount Equity Mortgage, and became CEO.

In 2011, Guthy-Renker became an investor and business partner assisting in the growth of Paramount Equity Mortgage and Paramount Solar. Barnard and Guthy-Renker also partnered with SolarCity.
In 2013, Paramount Solar was acquired by SolarCity for $120 million and Barnard became SolarCity's Chief Revenue Officer. As Chief Revenue Officer, he managed a team of 8,000. He was also responsible for the company's growth and grew megawatts installed 300% from 2013 to 2015.

In 2014, Barnard founded GivePower while at SolarCity. GivePower is a 501(c)(3) nonprofit organization that develops clean water and energy systems in underserved communities in developing countries. GivePower has developed water and energy systems in 17 countries, including communities in Africa, Asia, and Latin America. In 2018, Barnard's non-profit organization built a solar-powered desalination system in Kiunga, Kenya that produces 19,800 gallons of fresh drinking water a day. The organization also assisted the Sioux Nation in North Dakota in developing a 300-kilowatt solar farm in North Dakota, the first solar farm in the state.

In 2016, Barnard left SolarCity and took on the role of chairman and CEO of Loanpal, a financial technology platform that provides financing for clean energy products.

In 2020, Barnard started an asset management fund, GoodFinch.

In 2021, Loanpal rebranded to GoodLeap, "good for life, earth and prosperity."

Personal life
Barnard lives in Austin, Texas  with his wife and three children.

In October 2022, Barnard appeared on the cover of Forbes Magazine and ranked #271 on the Forbes 400 list with an estimated net worth of $4 billion. Forbes also awarded Barnard a self-made score of 10 out of 10, a score received by only 28 out of the 400 list members.

References 

Living people
American chief executives of financial services companies
People associated with solar power
American company founders
Year of birth missing (living people)